Restructuring is the act of reorganizing business structures.

Restructuring may also refer to:

 Debt restructuring, the reduction and renegotiation of debt
 Economic restructuring, the phenomenon of urban areas shifting their economic base from manufacturing to the service sector
 Cognitive restructuring, a process in cognitive therapy with the goal of replacing irrational beliefs with more accurate and beneficial ones
 Physical restructuring, the transfer, consolidation and closure activities of manufacturing plants

See also 
 Structuring
 Reconstruction
 Renegotiation